Neoscona byzanthina is an orb-weaver spider.

Distribution and habitat
This species occurs in France, Italy, Spain, southern European Russia and Turkey. These spiders mainly occur on low bushes and herbs.

Description
Cephalothorax (prosoma) is yellowish or light beige, covered with fine white hairs and with a dark brown longitudinal median stripe and two lateral stripes. The opisthosoma is brown and the dorsal design is rather variable. Usually it shows discontinuous brown bands with white markings bordered with brown lines. The hook of the epigyne is elongated and rounded. Legs are pale brown or yellowish and very darkly ringed. In particular, the apical ends of the femurs are quite dark. 

This species is very similar to Neoscona adianta, but the size of Neoscona byzanthina individuals and the size of their genitals are rather larger than in Neoscona adianta.

Biology
Adults are more frequent on August and September.

References

Pavesi, P. (1876b). Gli aracnidi Turchi. Atti della Società Italiana di Scienze Naturali 19: 1-27.
 Ledoux J-C (2008a) Réhabilitation de Neoscona byzanthina (Pavesi, 1876) espèce voisine de Neoscona adianta (Araneae, Araneidae). Revue arachnol 17: 49-53
 Ledoux, J.-C. & Canard, A. (1981). Initiation à l'étude systématique des araignées. Ledoux, Domazan, 56 pp.
 Mora-Rubio C, Morano E, Pérez-Bote J L (2019) First record of Neoscona byzanthina (Pavesi, 1876) (Araneae, Araneidae) from the Iberian Peninsula. Graellsia 75(e092): 1-3
Simon, E. (1879b). Liste d'arachnides de Constantinople et description d'une espèce nouvelle Epeira turcica. Annales de la Société Entomologique de France (5) 9(Bull.): 36-37.

byzanthina
Spiders described in 1876